Aiding and abetting is a legal doctrine related to the guilt of someone who aids or abets (encourages, incites) another person in the commission of a crime (or in another's suicide). It exists in a number of different countries and generally allows a court to pronounce someone guilty for aiding and abetting in a crime even if they are not the principal offender. The words aiding, abetting and accessory are closely used but have differences. While aiding means providing support or assistance to someone, committing a crime in exchange of a commission or compensation, abetting means encouraging someone else to commit a crime. Accessory is someone who in fact assists "commission of a crime committed primarily by someone else".

Canada
In Canada, a person who aids or abets in the commission of a crime is treated the same as a principal offender under the criminal law. Section 21(1) of the Criminal Code provides that:
Every one is a party to an offence who
(a) actually commits it;
(b) does or omits to do anything for the purpose of aiding any person to commit it; or
(c) abets any person in committing it.

To show that an accused aided or abetted in the commission of a crime, the Crown does not need to prove the guilt of a specific principal offender.

The Crown must show something more than mere presence to prove the act of aiding or abetting. Presence in the commission of a crime might be evidence of aiding and abetting if the accused had prior knowledge of the crime, or if the accused had legal duty or control over the principal offender. For example, the owner of a car who lets another person drive dangerously without taking steps to prevent it may be guilty because of their control over the driver's use of the vehicle.

Further, the Crown must show that the accused had prior knowledge that "an offence of the type committed was planned", but it is not necessary that the accused desired the result or had the motive of assisting the crime. Intention to assist the crime is sufficient.

United States

Criminal
Aiding and abetting is an additional provision in United States criminal law, for situations where it cannot be shown the party personally carried out the criminal offense, but where another person may have carried out the illegal act(s) as an agent of the charged, working together with or under the direction of the charged, who is an accessory to the crime. It is comparable to laws in some other countries governing the actions of accessories, including the similar provision in England and Wales under the Accessories and Abettors Act 1861.
 
It is derived from the United States Code (U.S.C.), section two of title 18:

The scope of this federal statute for aiders and abettors "is incredibly broad—it can be implied in every charge for a federal
substantive offense." Where the term "principal" refers to any actor who is primarily responsible for a criminal offense.

For a successful prosecution, the provision of "aiding and abetting" must be considered alongside the crime itself, although a defendant can be found guilty of aiding and abetting an offense even if the principal is found not guilty of the crime itself. In all cases of aiding and abetting, it must be shown a crime has been committed, but not necessarily who committed it. It is necessary to show that the defendant has wilfully associated himself with the crime being committed, that he does, through his own act or omission, as he would do if he wished for a criminal venture to succeed. Under this statute, anyone who aids or abets a crime may be charged directly with the  crime, as if the charged had carried out the act himself. This is distinct from the concept of being an accessory after the fact, a charge distinct from being a principal.

History 
The first United States statute dealing with accessory liability was passed in 1790, and made criminally liable those who should aid and assist, procure, command, counsel or advise murder or robbery on land or sea, or piracy at sea. This was broadened in 1870 to include any felony, and by it an accessory was anyone who counsels, advises or procures the crime.  These early statutes were repealed in 1909, and supplanted by 18 U.S.C. § 550, a statute which included the modern language of "Whoever aids, abets, counsels, commands, induces, or procures the commission of an offense is a principal."

In 1948, § 550 became 18 U.S.C. § 2(a). Section 2(b) was also added to make clear the legislative intent to punish as a principal not only one who directly commits an offense and one who "aids, abets, counsels, commands, induces or procures" another to commit an offense, but also anyone who causes the doing of an act which if done by him directly would render him guilty of an offense against the United States. It removes all doubt that one who puts in motion or assists in the illegal enterprise or causes the commission of an indispensable element of the offense by an innocent agent or instrumentality is guilty as a principal even though he intentionally refrained from the direct act constituting the completed offense.

Subsection (a) of Section 2 was amended to its current form in 1951 to read, "Whoever commits an offense against the United States or aids, abets, counsels, commands, induces or procures its commission, is punishable as a principal." Subsection (b) was also amended in 1951 to add "wilfully" and "is punishable as a principal."

Application to "white collar crimes" 

Since 2001, the Securities and Exchange Commission has filed a number of complaints related to the aiding and abetting of securities fraud. For example, CIBC and Merrill Lynch were separately charged with aiding and abetting Enron’s evasion of record keeping requirements and required financial controls. Settlements, including disgorgement, penalties, and interest reached $80 million in both cases.

Civil
Aiding and abetting is also a legal theory of civil accessory liability.  To prove accessory liability through "aiding and abetting," the plaintiffs must prove three elements: 
That Defendant B breached a duty to Plaintiff, the result of which injured Plaintiff;
That Defendant A knowingly and substantially assisted Defendant B in breaching the duty; and
That Defendant A was aware of its role in promoting the breach of duty at the time it provided assistance.

United Kingdom
The Accessories and Abettors Act 1861 provides that an accessory to an indictable offence shall be treated in the same way as if he had actually committed the offence himself. Section 8 of the Act, as amended, reads:

Section 10 states that the Act does not apply to Scotland. The rest of the Act was repealed by the Criminal Law Act 1967 as a consequence of the abolition of the distinction between felonies and misdemeanours.

See also

 Abettor

References

Criminal law